The 2008–09 season was Colchester United's 67th season in their history and first season back in the third tier of English football following relegation, League One. Alongside competing in League One, the club also participated in the FA Cup, the League Cup and the Football League Trophy.

Colchester returned to League One following relegation from the Championship last season. It was also their first season in their new home the Colchester Community Stadium after moving from Layer Road over the summer. It took them until October to register their first home victory by beating Carlisle United 5–0, but by this time the club had already seen managerial changes. After a poor start to the season in which the U's found themselves sporadically in the relegation zone, Geraint Williams was sacked and Paul Lambert was brought in as his replacement in early October. Colchester had a good mid-season run from November through January but had to settle for a mid-table finish come the end of the season.

Colchester were eliminated from the FA Cup at the first round stage by Leyton Orient, while rivals Ipswich Town beat the U's at Portman Road in the second round of the League Cup. They made the area semi-final of the Football League Trophy where they lost out to Luton Town.

Season overview
Following relegation from the Championship, Colchester experienced a summer of great change. Club stalwart Karl Duguid left the club to remain in the Championship with Plymouth Argyle, while top scorer Kevin Lisbie joined neighbours Ipswich Town for £600,000. To replace him, Geraint Williams once again broke the club's transfer record, signing Cheltenham Town forward Steven Gillespie for £400,000. Construction on the Colchester Community Stadium had completed and the moving process from Layer Road was underway during the summer months.

The first event to be held at the new stadium was a ramp-up exhibition game against Spanish side Athletic Bilbao on 4 August. Scott Vernon had the honour of scoring Colchester's first goal at their new home as 5,610 witnessed the 2–1 defeat for the U's.

The first ever league fixture came on 16 August when Colchester were held to a 0–0 draw against Huddersfield Town. Mark Yeates was the first competitive goalscorer at the Community Stadium, scoring both goals in a 2–2 draw with Oldham Athletic on 30 August. United couldn't find a win at home, and following a 3–0 defeat at the Stadium by Milton Keynes Dons, Williams was relieved of his duties with a record of one league win from six games and the club in the bottom four.

Assistant manager Kit Symons took charge for four games before Paul Lambert was unveiled as the new Colchester manager in early October. They earned their first home victory of the season on 25 October, a resounding 5–0 win over Carlisle United. Lambert brought in numerous loan players, including Marc Tierney and Jimmy Walker while also signing Alan Maybury.

In December, long-serving Chief Executive Marie Partner left the club as Robbie Cowling shuffled his boardroom, bringing in Steve Bradshaw to the position. Partner had spent over 21 years with the club. Cowling would soon buy out all remaining shares in the club.

The club earned back-to-back wins for the first time in 19 months as they beat Yeovil Town and Northampton Town to set up a run across the New Year of nine games unbeaten. A run of ten wins and four draws from 18 games eventually earned Lambert the January League One Manager of the Month award as the U's rose to seven points off the play-off positions.

Lambert made further late season loan signings by bringing in Karl Hawley, Neal Trotman and Ashley Vincent. However, with the play-offs on the horizon, Colchester's form took a downturn as they lost six of the remaining nine home games, including consecutive defeats in the final four home games. A club record attendance was set on 4 April, when 9,599 witnessed a 1–0 win for Leeds United at the Community Stadium. This was the highest attendance for a home league game since 20 April 1974 in a 2–0 defeat by Gillingham.

Colchester ended the season in 12th position, 13 points off a play-off place. They had endured their worst-ever home season, suffering twelve defeats, while they also enjoyed their best-ever away season, registering eleven victories on the road.

In the cup competitions, Colchester returned to the Football League Trophy by reaching the southern section semi-final, where they were eliminated by eventual winners Luton Town. They were beaten by Ipswich Town 2–1 in the second round of the League Cup at Portman Road, while Leyton Orient won in the first round of the FA Cup.

Players

Transfers

In

 Total spending:  ~ £500,000

Out

 Total incoming:  ~ £600,000

Loans in

Loans out

Match details

League One

League table

Results round by round

Matches

Football League Cup

Football League Trophy

FA Cup

Squad statistics

Appearances and goals

|-
!colspan="16"|Players who appeared for Colchester who left during the season

|}

Goalscorers

Disciplinary record

Clean sheets
Number of games goalkeepers kept a clean sheet.

Player debuts
Players making their first-team Colchester United debut in a fully competitive match.

See also
List of Colchester United F.C. seasons

References

General

Specific

2008-09
2008–09 Football League One by team